The following is the final results of the Iran Super League 2005/06 basketball season. The powerhouse Saba Battery were crowned champions of Iran's Super League, beating Petrochimi of Mahshahr 3 times in a row in the final phase of the competitions which was 3 out of 5. Saba had only one loss through the whole season in a game against Pegah of Shiraz, and it kept its dominancy over the other teams. In the third and last clash, Garth Joseph, the tallest import in the Iranian Super League (218 cm) made the last shot in just 1 second to the end of the match, and changed the score to 66-64.

Regular season

Group A

Group B

Playoffs

Championship

Quarterfinals

Semifinals

3rd place match

Final

Classifications

5th-8th places

9th-16th places

13th-16th places

Final ranking

 Saba Battery and Petrochimi qualified to WABA Champions Cup 2007.
 HB Esfahan and Farsh Mashhad relegated to Division 1.

References
 Final results
 Final ranking
 Asia-Basket

Iranian Basketball Super League seasons
League
Iran